Thuiaria is a genus of hydroids in the family Sertulariidae.

Species
The following species are classed in this genus:
Thuiaria abyssicola (Billard, 1925)
Thuiaria acutiloba Kirchenpauer, 1884
Thuiaria allmani (Norman, 1878)
Thuiaria alternans Naumov, 1952
Thuiaria alternitheca Levinsen, 1893
Thuiaria arctica (Bonnevie, 1899)
Thuiaria articulata (Pallas, 1766)
Thuiaria bidentata (Allman, 1876)
Thuiaria breitfussi (Kudelin, 1914)
Thuiaria carica Levinsen, 1893
Thuiaria cedrina (Linnaeus, 1758)
Thuiaria constans (Fraser, 1948)
Thuiaria cornigera Kudelin, 1914
Thuiaria coronifera Allman, 1876
Thuiaria cupressoides (Lepechin, 1783)
Thuiaria cylindrica Clark, 1876
Thuiaria deberki Kudelin, 1914
Thuiaria decemserialis (Merezhkovskii, 1878)
Thuiaria diffusa (Allman, 1885)
Thuiaria excepticea Fenyuk, 1947
Thuiaria gonorhiza Naumov, 1952
Thuiaria hartlaubi (Nutting, 1904)
Thuiaria hippuris Allman, 1874
Thuiaria insociabilis Fraser, 1948
Thuiaria invicea Naumov, 1960
Thuiaria involuta Naumov, 1960
Thuiaria kudelini Naumov, 1960
Thuiaria kurilae Nutting, 1904
Thuiaria laxa Allman, 1874
Thuiaria lebedi Naumov, 1960
Thuiaria mereschkowskii Kudelin, 1914
Thuiaria nivea Fenyuk, 1947
Thuiaria obsoleta (Lepechin, 1781)
Thuiaria ochotensis (Mereschkowsky, 1878)
Thuiaria operculata Watson, 2000
Thuiaria pinaster (Lepechin, 1783)
Thuiaria pinna Naumov, 1960
Thuiaria plumiformis (Nutting, 1904)
Thuiaria plumularioides Watson, 2000
Thuiaria purpurea (Linnaeus, 1758)
Thuiaria sachalini Kudelin, 1914
Thuiaria stelleri Kirchenpauer, 1884
Thuiaria subthuja (Fenyuk, 1947)
Thuiaria tetrastriata Naumov, 1960
Thuiaria thuja (Linnaeus, 1758)
Thuiaria trilateralis (Fraser, 1936)
Thuiaria triserialis (Merezhkovskii, 1878)
Thuiaria uschakovi Naumov, 1960
Thuiaria wulfiusi Naumov, 1960
Thuiaria zachsi Fenyuk, 1947

References

Sertulariidae
Hydrozoan genera